Penicillium idahoense is a species of the genus of Penicillium.

References

idahoense
Fungi described in 1971